Denton may refer to:

Places

In England
 Denton, Cambridgeshire, part of Denton and Caldecote
 Denton, County Durham
 Denton, East Sussex
 Denton, Gravesham, part of the town of Gravesend, Kent
 Denton, Greater Manchester
 Denton, Kent, a village near Canterbury
 Denton, Lincolnshire
 Denton, Newcastle upon Tyne
 Denton, Norfolk
 Denton, Northamptonshire, South Northamptonshire
 Denton, North Yorkshire
 Denton, Oxfordshire
 Denton Holme, Cumbria
 Upper Denton, Carlisle, Cumbria

In the United States
Denton, Georgia
Denton, Kansas
Denton, Kentucky
Denton, Maryland
Denton Township, Michigan
Denton, Johnson County, Missouri
Denton, Pemiscot County, Missouri
Denton, Montana
Denton, Nebraska
Denton, North Carolina
Denton, Texas, in Denton County
Denton County, Texas

Fictional places
Denton is the setting for the English TV series A Touch of Frost and the Frost novels of R. D. Wingfield
The fictional town which was the setting for The Rocky Horror Picture Show and its sequel Shock Treatment
Denton, a town in the 2016 film In a Valley of Violence

People
Denton (surname)
Denton Cooley (1920–2016), American heart surgeon
Dainton Connell (1961–2007), Arsenal hooligan leader, assistant to the Pet Shop Boys
Denton D. Lake (1887–1941), New York politician
Denton True "Cy" Young (1867–1955), American baseball pitcher
Denton Welch (1915–1948), English author and painter

Other
 Baron Denton, subsidiary title of Earl Kitchener of Khartoum created in the Peerage of the United Kingdom
Denton Hall, Wharfedale, Yorkshire, country house
Denton Manor, country house in Denton, Lincolnshire
Denton (talk show), Australian late night talk show (1994-1995), hosted by Andrew Denton.
Denton House (disambiguation), the name of two historic houses
Dr. Denton, an American brand of blanket sleepers
, a ship built in 1864 originally named Denton

See also

Danton (name)